Richard Webb may refer to:
Richard Webb (settler) (1580–1665), founding settler of Hartford and Norwalk, Connecticut
Richard D. Webb (1805–1872), Irish publisher and abolitionist
Sir Richard Webb (Royal Navy officer) (1870–1950), British admiral
Sir Richard Webb (New Zealand Army officer) (1919–1990), New Zealand general
Richard Webb (actor) (1915–1993), American film, television and radio actor
Richard A. Webb (1946–2016), American physicist
Richard Webb (cricketer) (born 1952), New Zealand cricketer

See also
Dick Webb, a British actor